Clark H. Pinnock (February 3, 1937 – August 15, 2010) was a Christian theologian, apologist and author.  He was Professor Emeritus of Systematic Theology at McMaster Divinity College.

Education and career
Pinnock was born in Toronto, Ontario, Canada on February 3, 1937.  He grew up in a liberal Baptist congregation. Pinnock once recounted that as a child he had little interest in the church. Even though he was brought up in Liberal Christianity, he later became part of the broad Evangelical tradition, and explored Reformed, Arminian and Pentecostal streams of thought.

Pinnock described his shifts in thought as a pilgrimage:

Pinnock studied in the Ancient Near Eastern Studies program at the University of Toronto and in 1960 he was graduated.  He then was awarded both a Woodrow Wilson Fellowship to Harvard and a British Commonwealth Scholarship to England.  Pinnock decided to go to England to study under F.F. Bruce at Manchester University. The dissertation for his Ph.D was "The Doctrine of the Holy Spirit in St. Paul". Several years later, in 1965, he joined the faculty of New Orleans Baptist Theological Seminary. From 1969 to 1974 Pinnock taught at Trinity Evangelical Divinity School, Deerfield, Illinois, and from 1974 to 1977 at Regent College in Vancouver. He taught at McMaster Divinity College from 1977 until his retirement in 2002.

Theology
Though Pinnock was probably most widely known as a proponent of open theism, he contributed to many other areas of theology as well.  For example, Pinnock’s most thorough work of systematic theology may be his book Flame of Love, which was a 1997 Christianity Today book award winner.  In it he explored various aspects of theology from the perspective of the Holy Spirit.  In this book he dealt with issues relating to the Trinity, Christ, the church, union with God, and revelation.  His theology centered around the Trinity, and it was both sacramental and charismatic.  He drew on influences from within Protestantism, Pentecostalism, Roman Catholicism, and Eastern Orthodoxy.

In his book A Wideness in God’s Mercy, Pinnock explored the idea of the destiny of the unevangelized.  He contended that pluralism is a major issue in modern theology, and that strict exclusivism is as well.   He opted for a position known as inclusivism.  He said that it is misguided to affirm that general revelation can only condemn since God is the Lord of both general and special revelation.  He affirmed that salvation is through Christ alone, but he was open to the idea that people may respond to the light that they have.  He sought to back this up from a Scriptural perspective citing examples like Melchizedek.  He also left open the possibility of post-mortem conversion.

Most Moved Mover was his most thorough explanation of his open theist perspective.  His book Tracking the Maze dealt with the situation of modern theology and sought to arrive at a way forward, and The Scripture Principle, coauthored with Barry Callen, explored an evangelical view of Scripture.  Barry Callen also wrote Pinnock’s biography entitled Journey Toward Renewal.

Clark Pinnock wrote articles on several other issues including an annihilationist view of hell.  In this he stated the problems with the traditional view and went forward to show how an annihilationist view can be perfectly founded in Scripture.  He faulted the traditional view with grossly distorting the character of God and to be based on unbiblical presuppositions.  He claimed that, since souls are not inherently eternal (the view of souls being eternal in and of themselves coming from Plato and not Paul), it is not hard to understand imagery like consuming fire to consume and eternal destruction to mean destroyed eternally.   He noted that this is still a very serious matter for one to miss out on all that one was intended for.

Upon Pinnock's death, Christianity Today wrote of him that "he was reputed to study carefully, think precisely, argue forcefully, and shift his positions willingly if he discovered a more fruitful pathway of understanding".

Works

Books

Articles and chapters

 - newer edition has differing authors

Festschrift
 Stanley E. Porter and Anthony R. Cross, eds. Semper Reformandum: Studies in Honour of Clark H. Pinnock Carlisle, Cumbria: Paternoster Press, 2003.

See also
Open theism
Annihilationism

Bibliography

References

External links
The Metaphysics of Love, 2003 Bentall Lectures in Theology
 "Clark Pinnock Dies at 73" by Doug Koop. Christianity Today website, posted 2010-08-17
The Destruction of the Finally Impenitent by Clark H. Pinnock of McMaster Divinity College. -- Sorry, the site you requested has been disabled
Unbounded Love
Bio page at McMaster University

Canadian Baptist theologians
Christian apologists
Harvard Fellows
1937 births
2010 deaths
People from Toronto
New Orleans Baptist Theological Seminary faculty
University of Toronto alumni
Alumni of the University of Manchester
20th-century Baptists